Valentin Yakovlevich Brodsky (Валентин Яковлевич БРОДСКИЙ) (born 1905-died 1981) was a Soviet artist and art critic. He was born in Kharkiv in 1905, in the family of a medical doctor. He studied under the artists A.D. Silin, P.A. Shillingovsky and M.V. Dobuzhinsky. 

He served in the army during the Second World War, heading up the Baltic Fleet translation bureau. He lived through the siege of Leningrad, which served as the basis of a series of drawings during the 1940s. He finished the war with the rank of major. After the war, he taught at Leningrad State University.

He died in 1981. His son Vadim V. Brodsky is also an artist.

References

1905 births
1981 deaths
Soviet artists